is a 2012 Japanese television drama series.

Cast
Riisa Naka as Shizuku Miyama 
Kento Hayashi as Yazawa Kei
Takahisa Masuda as Manaka Junichi
Aya Omasa as Hinako Koiwai
Anna Ishibashi as Sachi Shinjo 
Yukiyoshi Ozawa as Kazuki Miyajima 
Arata Furuta as Ikuo Tabuchi 
Risa Sudo as Yayoi Kasumi

References

External links
Official website 

Japanese drama television series
2012 Japanese television series debuts
TBS Television (Japan) dramas